Ixodes siamensis is an ixodid tick (hard tick) that is parasitic on mammals in Thailand.

References

siamensis
Arachnids of Asia
Animals described in 1973